12th Battalion may refer to:

 12th Battalion (Australia), a unit of the Australian Army
 12th Battalion, Canadian Expeditionary Forces, a unit of the Canadian Army
 12 (Vancouver) Service Battalion, a unit of the Canadian Army
 12th Philippine Scout Battalion, a unit of the Philippine Army
 The United Kingdom Army unit 12th Battalion, Durham Light Infantry

See also

 Twelfth Army (disambiguation)
 XII Corps (disambiguation)
 12th Division (disambiguation)
 12th Brigade (disambiguation)
 12th Regiment (disambiguation)
 12th Group (disambiguation)
 12 Squadron (disambiguation)